This is a list of notable people from the city of Alicante, Spain or notable foreigners who live or lived there:

George Washington Montgomery (1804–1841), United States diplomat and editor/publisher of the first Spanish-language translation of the works of Washington Irving.
Carlos Arniches (1866–1943), novelist
Rafael Altamira y Crevea (1866–1951), co-founder of Permanent Court of International Justice so-called the World Court, after 1945 International Court of Justice
Francisco Javier de Balmis (1753–1819), physician who headed the Balmis expedition to vaccinate the Spanish-colonies population against smallpox.
Lorenzo Carbonell Santacruz, mayor in 1931–1936
Francesc de Paula Castelló Aleu (1914-1936), chemist, blessed Roman Catholic 
Alex De Minaur, tennis player
Manuel Senante (1873–1959), Carlist publisher and politician
Gabriel Miró (1879–1930), novelist
Antonio Gades (1936–2004), Flamenco dancer
Juan Escarré (1969), field hockey player
Lola Forner (1960), former Miss Spain 1979 and actor
Belen Rueda, actor
Antoni Egea, artist
David Ferrer, tennis player
Miriam Blasco, judoka Olympic winner
Isabel Fernández, judoka Olympic winner
Esther Cañadas, model and actor
Pedro Ferrándiz, basketball coach
Francisco Rufete, footballer
Miguel Hernández, poet
Ricardo Llorca (born 1962), composer
Kiko Martínez, boxer
Nahemah, Extreme metal band
José Perramón, handball player
Asunción Valdés (born 1950), journalist
Sandra Paños, goalkeeper 
Arkano, rapper
Ilia Topuria, UFC fighter

References 

Alicante